Straight from My Heart is the third album by singer Pebbles. It was released on September 12, 1995, on MCA Records and spawned the top 40 R&B hit, "Are You Ready?".

Track listing
"Club Laid Back" (Intro) - 2:52
"Like the Last Time" - 4:06 (Armando Colon, Erik Milteer, Alex Richbourg)
"Are You Ready?" - 4:35 (Arthur Hoyle, Debra Killings, Pebbles, Richbourg, Jason Sylvain, Mario Winans)
"I Can't Help It" - 5:06 (Susaye Greene, Stevie Wonder)
"You" - 4:17 (Sean Combs, Milteer, Pebbles, Carl Thompson)
"Happy" - 4:58 (McKinley Horton, Pebbles)
"Soul Replacement" - 4:40 (Big Rube, Marqueze Etheridge, Faith Evans, Organized Noize)
"Club Laid Back" (Reprise) - 0:30
"It's Alright" - 4:03 (Ward Corbett, Milteer, Pebbles, Tony Rich)
"Show Me" - 5:17 (Pebbles)
"Straight from My Heart" - 4:20 (Marc Nelson, Darrell Spencer, Kyle West)
"Angel" - 4:55 (Pebbles)
"One More Try" - 3:45 (Nelson, Pebbles, Spencer, West)
"Long Way to Travel" - 4:24 (Joe Rich, T. Rich)
"Club Laid Back (Outro) - 1:58
"Are You Ready?" (Mario Mix) [Import Bonus & Digital Music Exclusive] - 4:02 (Arthur Hoyle, Debra Killings, Pebbles, Richbourg, Jason Sylvain, Mario Winans)

Production
Producers: Pebbles, Alex Richbourg, Organized Noize, Sean "Puffy" Combs, Chucky Thompson, Tony Rich, Joe Rich, Kyle West, Mario Winans
Engineers: Tom Cassel, Mike Wilson, John Frye
Audio Mixer: Tom Cassel

Chart

References

1995 albums
Pebbles (singer) albums
MCA Records albums